Achraf Akhamrane (born 10 June 1997) is a Dutch football player who plays for the reserve team of SC Cambuur. He also holds Moroccan citizenship.

Club career
He made his professional debut in the Eerste Divisie for SC Cambuur on 28 January 2017 in a game against FC Dordrecht.

References

External links
 

1997 births
Living people
Dutch footballers
Dutch sportspeople of Moroccan descent
SC Cambuur players
Eerste Divisie players
Association football midfielders
Footballers from Amsterdam